The name Easy was given to three tropical cyclones in the Atlantic Ocean.

 Hurricane Easy (1950) - made landfall in Florida as a Category 3 hurricane; caused heavy damage in Cedar Key and produced heavy rainfall
 Hurricane Easy (1951) - Category 4 hurricane that never threatened land.
 Hurricane Easy (1952) - a minor storm

Atlantic hurricane set index articles